The Egypt men's national tennis team represents Egypt in Davis Cup tennis competition and are governed by the Egyptian Tennis Federation.

Egypt currently compete in the Europe/Africa Zone of Group II.  They reached the semifinals of Group I in 1982 and 1985.

History
Egypt competed in its first Davis Cup in 1929.

Current team (2022)

 Mohamed Safwat
 Amr Elsayed
 Karim-Mohamed Maamoun
 Michael Bassem Sobhy
 Faris Zakaryia

Performance

2010s

2000s

1990s

See also
Davis Cup
Egypt Fed Cup team

External links

Davis Cup teams
Davis Cup
Davis Cup